The Southern Illinois Roller Girls (SIRG, or So Ill Roller Girls) is a women's flat track roller derby league based in Marion, Illinois. So Ill is a member of the Women's Flat Track Derby Association (WFTDA).

History
The league was founded in June 2009 by a group of women from the area and So Ill Roller Girls had their first public scrimmage in December 2009, and their first official home bout in April 2010.  It was accepted into the Women's Flat Track Derby Association Apprentice Program in January 2011, and became a full member of the WFTDA in January 2012.

Southern Illinois Roller Girls currently play at The Pavilion of the city of Marion, and their regular bouting season runs from March until November.

WFTDA rankings

References

Marion, Illinois
Roller derby leagues in Illinois
Roller derby leagues established in 2009
Women's Flat Track Derby Association Division 3
2009 establishments in Illinois